The city of Ottawa, Canada held municipal elections on December 1, 1958.

Mayor George Nelms is re-elected with a comfortable margin.

Mayor of Ottawa

Ottawa Board of Control
(4 elected)

City council

(2 elected from each ward)

References
Ottawa Citizen, December 2, 1958

Municipal elections in Ottawa
1958 elections in Canada
1950s in Ottawa
1958 in Ontario
December 1958 events in North America